Théophile Alajouanine (12 June 1890 – 2 May 1980) was a French neurologist.

Théophile Alajouanine was born in Verneix, Allier. He was a student of Joseph Jules Dejerine and a colleague of Georges Guillain and Charles Foix. He was a prolific writer on many topics but was particularly interested in aphasia.

A great scholar and enthusiastic bibliophile, Alajouanine had privileged relationships with famous writers during his neurological and neuropsychological career. Fyodor Dostoevsky's biography and works provided him with a penetrating look into the world of epilepsy. He was the composer Ravel's neurologist, and published an account of the composer's aphasia.
  

The Laboratoire Théophile-Alajouanine, Centre hospitalier Côte-des-Neiges, Montréal is named after him.

Associated eponyms
 Foix–Alajouanine syndrome: a rare disease of the spinal cord characterized by dysfunction of the spinal cord due to a dural arteriovenous malformation.
 Marie–Foix–Alajouanine syndrome: ataxia of the cerebellum in advanced age. Frequently due to abuse of alcohol.

References 

1890 births
1980 deaths
French neurologists
French medical writers
Grand Officiers of the Légion d'honneur
People from Allier